The 1958 Dutch Grand Prix was a Formula One motor race held on 26 May 1958 at Zandvoort. It was race 3 of 11 in the 1958 World Championship of Drivers and race 3 of 10 in the 1958 International Cup for Formula One Manufacturers.

Classification

Qualifying

Race

Notes
 – Includes 1 point for fastest lap

Championship standings after the race

Drivers' Championship standings

Constructors' Championship standings

 Note: Only the top five positions are included for both sets of standings.

References

Dutch Grand Prix
Dutch Grand Prix
Grand Prix
Dutch Grand Prix